Purvamnaya Sri Govardhana Peetham or Govardhan Math is one amongst the five cardinal peethams established by the philosopher-saint Bhagwan Adi Shankaracharya to preserve and propagate Sanatana Dharma and Advaita Vedanta, the doctrine of non-dualism. Located in Puri in Odisha, India, it is the Eastern Āmnāya Pītham amongst the five Peethams, with the others being the Sringeri Śārada Pīṭhaṃ (Karnataka) in the South, Dvārakā Śāradā Pītham (Gujarat) in the West, Badari Jyotirmaṭha Pīṭhaṃ (Uttarakhand) in the North  and the Sarvagnya Pītham being Kanchi Kamakoti Pīṭham (Tamil Nadu). It is associated with the Jagannath temple. Their Vedantic mantra or Mahavakya is Prajñānam brahma (Consciousness is supreme being) and as per the tradition initiated by Adi Shankara it holds authority over Rig Veda. The head of the matha is called Shankarayacharya, the title derives from Adi Shankara.

The deities here are Jagannath (Lord Vishnu) and the devi is Vimala (Bhairavi). There are Shri Vigrahas of Govardhananatha Krishna and Ardhanareshvara Shiva installed by Adi Shankara.

The whole of the Eastern part of the Indian subcontinent is considered as the territory of Sri Govardhan Peeth. This includes the Indian states of Bihar, Jharkhand, Chhattisgarh, Andhra Pradesh till Rajamundry, Odisha, West Bengal, Assam, Arunachal Pradesh, Manipur, Nagaland, Sikkim, Meghalaya, Telangana, Tripura, Mizoram, and Uttar Pradesh till Prayag. The countries Nepal, Bangladesh, and Bhutan as well as the Southeast Asian and Tibetan regions, are also considered spiritual territory of the math. Puri, Prayagraj, Gaya and Varanasi are some of the holy places under this Math.

Background

Govardhana matha is one of four cardinal institutions established by Adi Shankara (c. 8th century CE), regarded by later tradition as the reviver of Vedic Sanatana Dharma. Shankara's four principal disciples, Padma-Pada, Hasta-Malaka, Vartika-Kara or Sureshvara and Totakacharya were assigned to these four learning centers in the north, south, east and west of India. The subsequent leaders of each of these four monasteries are known as Śaṅkarāchāryas in honor of the math's founder, Adi Shankara. As such they are the leaders of the Daśanāmī Saṃnyāsins who are considered to have custody of Advaita Vedānta These four principle seats of learning are located in Purī (Odisha), Śṛṅgeri (Karnataka) and Dvārakā (Gujarat) with the northern (Uttarāmnāya) monastery being located in the city of Jyotirmaṭh (also known as Joṣīmaṭh).

History
Padmapadacharya became the first leader of the matha. The matha has historical connections with the Jagannath temple, which is also located in Puri. It is called the Govardhanathatha, and has sub-location called the Sankarananda Math.

Swami Bharati Krishna Tirtha, who was then the leader at the Dvaraka matha, assumed the leadership position at the Govardhana matha in 1925; Shankara Prushottama Tirtha supervised the Matha on his behalf while he visited the Self Realization Fellowship in the USA.  After Bharati attained Mahasamadhi in 1960, Yogeswaranda Tirtha succeeded him who also attained Mahasamadhi a year later in 1961. In 1964, after a "period of uncertainty" Niranjana Deva Tirtha, a disciple named in Bharati's will, was installed by Aghinava Saccindananda Tirtha of Dvarka. 
Nirnjana Deva Tirtha became known for his unpopular political views affecting the Hindu people. In 1992, he stepped down after nominating Niscalananda Saraswati as his successor.

Niscalananda Saraswati was born in Darbhanga in  1943, the son of the raj-Pandita of Maharaja of Darabhanga. He decided to enter sanyasa while being a student in the Tibbia College and spent time studying the shastras at Kashi, Vrindavan, Naimisaranya, Shringeri etc. In 1974, he took diksha from Swami Karpatri who gave him name Niscalananda.

On 11 February 2018 silver jubilee (25th anniversary) of the pattabhisheka (coronation) of Swami Nischalananda Saraswati was celebrated in Puri in the presence of chief minister of Orissa Naveen Patnaik, former Nepal king Gyanendra Bir Bikram Shah Dev and Gajapati Maharaja Dibyasingha Deb of Puri.

Samudra Arati
The Samudra Arati is a daily tradition started by the present Shankaracharya 9 years ago. The daily practise includes prayer and fire offering to the sea at Swargadwara in Puri by disciples of the matha. On Paush Purnima of every year the Shankaracharya himself comes out to offer prayers to the sea.

See also
 Adi Shankara           
 Shankaracharya         
Kalady, Kerala - the holy birthplace of Jagadguru Adi Shankaracharya                                      
Dwarka Sharada Peetham (West), Dwarka, Gujarat                  
Jyotirmath Peetham (North), Badrikashram, Uttarakhand                  
Shri Sringeri Sharada Peetham (South), Sringeri, Karnataka                 
Shri Kanchi Kamakoti Peetham, Kancheepuram, Tamil Nadu       
Shri Gaudapadacharya Mutt
Gaudapada
Govinda Bhagavatpada

References

External links
YouTube Channel
Twitter

Hindu pilgrimage sites in India
Hindu organisations based in India
Shankaracharya mathas in India
Tourist attractions in Puri district
Mathas in Puri
Adi Shankara
Advaita Vedanta